Aaron Katz may refer to:
 Aaron Katz (Soviet general) (1901–1971), Red Army major general and member of the Jewish Anti-Fascist Committee
 Aaron Katz (filmmaker) (born 1981), American independent filmmaker

See also
Aharon Katzir (1914–1972), Israeli pioneer in the study of the electrochemistry of biopolymers